Ariadna Capiró Felipe (born February 4, 1983) is a women's basketball player from Cuba. Playing as a guard she won the gold medal with the Cuba women's national basketball team at the 2003 Pan American Games in Santo Domingo, Dominican Republic.

References
 Ariadna Capiro Felipe profile at FIBA

1983 births
Living people
Basketball players from Havana
Cuban women's basketball players
Basketball players at the 2003 Pan American Games
Pan American Games gold medalists for Cuba
Pan American Games medalists in basketball
Guards (basketball)
Medalists at the 2003 Pan American Games